This is a list of fellows of the Royal Society elected in its 16th year, 1675.

Fellows 
Sir Philip Percivale  (1656–1680)
Daniel Milles  (1626–1689)
George Savile 1st Marquess of Halifax (1633–1695)
Sir Paul Whichcote, 2nd Baronet  (1643–1721)

References

1675
1675 in science
1675 in England